Châteauroux is the capital city of the French department of Indre, central France and the second-largest town in the province of Berry, after Bourges. Its residents are called Castelroussins in French.

Climate

History
The old town, close to the river, forms a nucleus around which a newer and more extensive quarter, bordered by boulevards, has grown up. The suburbs of St. Christophe and Déols lie on the right bank of the Indre. The castle from which the city takes its name was built in the latter part of the 10th century by Raoul, prince of Déols. 

From 920 to 1008, the Norman raids forced the monks of the abbey of Saint-Gildas-de-Rhuys, founded in Brittany by Saint Gildas, to bring his relics to the abbey of Saint-Gildas of Châteauroux that they founded under the protection of the prince Ebbes of Déols, father of Raoul. During the Middle Ages it was the seat of a seigniory. It was passed to the Chauvigny from 1207 to 1473. It was raised to the rank of countship in 1497 for Jean V d'Aumont. 

In 1616, when it was held by Henry II, Prince of Condé, it was raised to the rank of duchy. In 1736 it returned to the crown. It was given to Marie Anne de Mailly-Nesle, duchess of Châteauroux, by Louis XV in 1744. The present Château Raoul housing the préfecture offices dates from the 15th century.

Awards
Châteauroux is one of the communes awarded the grand prize by the Concours National des Villes et Villages Fleuris, a beautification initiative begun in 1959.

Monuments
 Château Raoul, 15th century
 Church of St. André, 19th century
 Church of St. Martial, 12th-16th century
 Église Notre-Dame, 19th century
 Convent of the Cordeliers, 13th century
 Equinoxe
 La Prairie St. Gildas
 Le Parc de loisirs de Belle-Isle
 Le Tarmac
 Musée Bertrand
 Musée des Arts et Traditions Populaires
 Musée du Compagnonnage
 Public Garden and the Jardins des Cordeliers
 Quartier St. Christophe

Sports
La Berrichonne de Châteauroux is the town's football club based in Châteauroux, founded in 1883. The team currently plays in National, the third division of French football, and played only one season in Ligue 1 in 1997–98. Châteauroux reached the final of the 2003–04 Coupe de France, where they were defeated 1–0 by Paris Saint-Germain, qualifying for the following season's UEFA Cup. The team play their home fixtures at the 17,173-capacity Stade Gaston Petit.

As Chateauroux was an Air Force base from 1952 until 1967, American football was played in Chateauroux by a team called Sabres. "Sabres" was one of the best European military teams, playing against other French and German teams. Local French people created a football club, playing in the French American football championship. The name chosen is "Sabres", to celebrate the pioneers, to pay homage to the Americans who were the first.

Festivals

 Bals'arts
 Festival Country Good Old Days Châteauroux
 Festival de théâtre "les Nocthalies"
 Festival Multirythmes
 Festival Populaire du Folklore
 Forum des associations
 La Biennale de Céramique contemporaine
 La Châteauroux Classic d'Indre Trophée Fenioux
 Les Litztomanias
 Rock à Belle-Isle
 Salon du livre de Châteauroux
 Stage festival de danse de Châteauroux (DARC)
 Vendredi...Musique

Transport
There are direct services from Châteauroux railway station to Paris, Orléans, Limoges, Toulouse, and several other regional destinations. The A20 motorway connects Châteauroux with Vierzon, Brive-la-Gaillarde, and Toulouse.

The city offers free public transportation since 2001. Total ridership is up 208% between 2001 and 2012.

The city is served by Châteauroux-Centre "Marcel Dassault" Airport which is in the commune of Déols to the North. The airport is used mainly for cargo, maintenance, training and light aviation but also is served by seasonal charter services.

Notable people

Born in Châteauroux
 Henri Gratien, Comte Bertrand (1773–1844), general of Napoleon's army
 Albert Aurier (1865–1892), symbolist poet, writer and art critic
 Marcel Boussac (1889–1980), entrepreneur and horse breeder
 Robert Falcucci (1900-1989), illustrator
  (born 1943), author, City Councilor of Lésigny (France), initiator of Lésigny-Leingarten twinning, founder and first President of Rencontres Franco Allemandes, Annecy (Annecy-Bayreuth twinning)
 Gérard Depardieu (born 1948), actor and businessman
 Dean Brown (born 1955), jazz guitarist
 Mardi Jacquet (born 1960), playmate
 Tom Darby (born 1960), American journalist, Nevada Broadcast Hall of Fame inductee, author and blogger
 Gilles Sunu (born 1991), footballer

Others associated with the area
  (1560–1620), poet
 Pierre Leroux (1797–1871), philosopher and politician
  (1807–1865), publisher
  (1859–1939), writer
 Fernand Maillaud (1862–1948), painter
 Bernard Naudin (1876–1946), painter and designer
 Ernest Nivet (1871–1948), sculptor
 Émile Goué (1904–1946)
 Édouard Ramonet (1909–1980), politician
 Jean Fourton (1934-), writer, humanist, painter and psychoanalyst. Former town councillor of Châteauroux (1957 to 1967).

International relations

Châteauroux is twinned with:
 Gütersloh, Germany, since 1977
 Bittou, Burkina Faso, since 1985
 Olsztyn, Poland, since 1991
 Fresno, United States, since 2016
 Jinhua, China, since 2019

Population

See also

 Berrichonne de Châteauroux
 Châteauroux-Déols "Marcel Dassault" Airport
 Communes of the Indre department
 Marie-Anne de Mailly-Nesle duchess de Châteauroux
 Saint-Benoît-du-Sault

References

 https://web.archive.org/web/20080327174957/http://www.villes-et-villages-fleuris.com/chateaur.htm

External links

 City of Châteauroux Official Website

Communes of Indre
Prefectures in France
Berry, France